The weightlifting competitions at the 2018 Mediterranean Games took place between 23 and 27 June at the Constantí Pavilion in Constantí.

Athletes competed in 12 weight categories (6 for men and 6 for women).

Medal summary

Men's events

Women's events

Medal table

Participating nations

Men's results

Men's 62 kg

Men's 69 kg

Men's 77 kg

Men's 85 kg

Men's 94 kg

References

External links
2018 Mediterranean Games – Weightlifting
Results Book

Sports at the 2018 Mediterranean Games
2018
Mediterranean Games